Babette may refer to:

 Babette (given name), a feminine name
 Babette (card game), a type of solitaire
 Babette (clothing line)
 Babette (film), a 1917 silent film
 , a US Navy patrol vessel in commission from 1917 to 1919
 8344 Babette, an asteroid
 Babette, first boat design of William J. Roué

See also
 Babette's, a supper club in Atlantic City, New Jersey